Trametes is a genus of fungi that is distinguished by a pileate basidiocarp, di- to trimitic hyphal systems, smooth non-dextrinoid spores, and a hymenium usually without true hymenial cystidia. The genus has a widespread distribution and contains about fifty species. The genus was circumscribed by Elias Magnus Fries in 1836.

Trametes fungi are food for caterpillars of certain Lepidoptera, mainly fungus moths (Tineidae) such as Triaxomera parasitella.

Biotechnology
Several species of Trametes have been investigated for biotechnological application of their lignin-degrading enzymes (particularly laccase and manganese peroxidase) for analytical, industrial or environmental sciences.

Selected species

Trametes gibbosa – Lumpy bracket
Trametes hirsuta – Hairy bracket
Trametes nivosa
Trametes pubescens
Trametes versicolor – Turkey tail

References

Further reading
Zmitrovich I.V., Malysheva V.F. (2013). Towards a phylogeny of Trametes alliance (Basidiomycota, Polyporales).  Mikologiya i fitopatologiya. Vol. 47, N 6. P. 358–380 (http://media.wix.com/ugd/b65817_d1162add57d74fe08e46f728018208ac.pdf).

Polyporaceae
Taxa described in 1836
Taxa named by Elias Magnus Fries
Polyporales genera